Bill Alfond (born 1949) is an American investor, philanthropist, and billionaire.

In 2022, Forbes estimated his fortune at around $2.4 billion.

Biography
Alfond was born to a Jewish family, the son of Dorothy (née Levine) and Harold Alfond. He graduated from Governor Dummer Academy (now The Governor’s Academy) in 1967, where he now serves as a trustee. His father founded the Dexter Shoe Company in 1958 and sold it in 1995 for $433 million of Berkshire Hathaway stock. When his father died in 2007, he left his shares in Berkshire Hathaway to his four children, Ted, Susan, Bill, and Peter, who are now all billionaires.

Personal life
Alfond is married to Joan Loring, who is also Jewish. They have three children: Justin Alfond, Kenden Alfond, and Reis Alfond. The couple lives in Belgrade, Maine.

References

American billionaires
1949 births
People from Belgrade, Maine
Jewish American philanthropists
Living people
Bill
The Governor's Academy alumni
Fenway Sports Group people